Events from the year 1950 in Pakistan.

Incumbents

Monarch
 King George VI (consort – Queen Elizabeth)

Federal government
 Governor-General – Khawaja Nazimuddin
 Prime Minister: Liaquat Ali Khan
 Chief Justice: Abdul Rashid

Governors
 Governor of Northwest Frontier: 
 until 14 January: Sahibzada Mohammad Khurshid 
 14 January-17 February: Khan Bahadur Muhammad Ibrahim Khan
 starting 17 February: Ismail Ibrahim Chundrigar
 Governor of West Punjab: Abdur Rab Nishtar 
 Governor of Sindh: Mian Aminuddin

Events

January
 4 January - President of Pakistan recognizes People's Republic of China.

April
 2 April – Liaquat Ali Khan visits Delhi for meetings with Indian Prime Minister Nehru.
 8 April – Liaquat and Nehru sign what becomes known as the Liaquat-Nehru Pact.
 The Roman Catholic Archdiocese of Karachi, originally known as the Diocese of Karachi, erected on 20 May 1948, was elevated as the Archdiocese of Karachi on 15 July 1950.
 Fashion in Pakistan changed dramatically.

May
 18 May - Peshawar University is established.

July
 July 11 - Pakistan joins the International Monetary Fund and World Bank.

September
 September 6 - General Mohammad Ayub Khan, becomes the first Pakistani as Commander-in-Chief of the Pakistan Army.

See also
 1949 in Pakistan
 1951 in Pakistan
 List of Pakistani films of 1950
 Timeline of Pakistani history

 
1950 in Asia